Coleotechnites carbonaria is a moth of the family Gelechiidae. It is found in North America, where it has been recorded from Ontario and Tennessee.

The wingspan is 7.5–10 mm. The forewings are black with white oblique fasciae and ochreous scales. The hindwings are fuscous.

The larvae feed on Juniperus species. They mine the leaves and stems of their host plant. They initially mine the terminal leaves and stem. Overwintering takes place in either the stem or leaf mine. In spring, the larvae continues mining the stem, and hollows out leaves from the inside.

References

Moths described in 1965
Coleotechnites